Huejo or Huecco (possibly from Aymara for a corner in a house, a mountain cove) is a mountain in the Apolobamba mountain range in Peru, about  high. It is situated in the Puno Region, Putina Province, Sina District. Huejo lies north of the mountain Riti Urmasca.

References 

Mountains of Puno Region
Mountains of Peru